Villemomble Sports is a French football club based in Villemomble (Seine-Saint-Denis). Founded in 1922, it currently plays in the Championnat de France Amateurs (French fourth-tier league), holding hold home games at the Stade Georges Pompidou, which has a capacity of 1,000.

Team colours are blue and white.

Honours
Championnat de France Amateurs 2 (Group H): 2004–05
DH Paris: 2003–04

Current squad 

	

 

Association football clubs established in 1922
1922 establishments in France
Sport in Seine-Saint-Denis
Football clubs in Paris